Benito Boldi (19 February 1934 – 3 February 2021) was an Italian professional footballer who played as a defender.

Career
Boldi was part of the Juventus teams that won the 1957–58 Serie A and the 1958–59 Coppa Italia. He played for SPAL and Catania in Serie B and for Cesena and Biellese in Serie C.

Personal life
Boldi was born in Tarcento, Province of Udine. His brothers Mario Boldi and Luciano Boldi also played football professionally. To distinguish them, Benito was known as Boldi II. He was married with two children.

Death
Boldi died from complications brought about by COVID-19 on 3 February 2021, during the COVID-19 pandemic in Italy, sixteen days short from his 87th birthday.

Honours
 Serie A: 1957–58
 Coppa Italia: 1958–59

References

1934 births
2021 deaths
Italian footballers
Association football defenders
Serie A players
Serie B players
Serie C players
S.P.A.L. players
Juventus F.C. players
Catania S.S.D. players
A.C. Cesena players
A.S.D. La Biellese players
Deaths from the COVID-19 pandemic in Piedmont